Yisroel Aryeh Zalmanowitz (1916-2003) was a rosh yeshiva in Bursha before the Holocaust. After the Holocaust he was one of the Rabbis of Bergen-Belsen. Later in Israel, he was Chief Rabbi of Acre and the Rabbi of Kiryat Sanz.

Biography
Zalmanowitz was born on December 29, 1916, in Kechnia Romania. His father was Rabbi Shemuel Nuta.

In his youth, Zalmanowitz studied in several yeshivas in Transylvania, including Visheva and Klausenberg where he became one of the most prominent disciples of Rabbi Yekusiel Yehudah Halberstam.

Rosh Yeshiva of Bursha
Rabbi Zalmanowitz married in 1941 as was appointed one of the Roshei Yeshiva in Bursha.

Rabbi of Bergen-Belsen and Member of the Vaad Harabonim of The British Zone
Rabbi Zalmanowitz survived the Holocaust and was liberated in Bergen-Belsen on April 11, 1945. He was appointed to be one of member rabbis of the bais din in Bergen-Belsen and together with the other rabbis was instrumental in permitting numerous agunot to remarry.

Rabbi Zalmanowitz was also appointed to be one of the member Rabbis of the Vaad Harabonim of The British Zone, which was established and led by Rabbi Yoel Halpern.

Rabbi of Kiryat Sanz and Chief Rabbi of Acre
Rabbi Zalmanowitz emigrated to Israel and in the early 1960s became the Chief Rabbi of Acre. Additionally, he was appointed Rabbi of Kiryat Sanz.

Death
Rabbi Zalmanowitz died on June 23, 2003, and was buried in Petah Tikva.

Family
Rabbi Zalmanowitz's first wife and their daughter were murdered in Auschwitz in 1944. After the holocaust. Rabbi Zalmanowitz remarried and had three sons and three daughters. One of his sons-in-law is Rabbi Asher Weiss.

References

20th-century Romanian rabbis
Hasidic rabbis in Europe
Bergen-Belsen concentration camp survivors
Romanian emigrants to Israel
People from Maramureș County
Burials at Segula Cemetery
1916 births
2003 deaths
20th-century Israeli rabbis